Fabian Hinrichs (born 1974) is a German actor. He is probably best known for his performance as Hans Scholl in Sophie Scholl – The Final Days, which was nominated for Academy Award for Best Foreign Language Film.

Hinrichs has also been a member of the German Film Academy and the European Film Academy. From 2000 to 2006, he was a member of the Volksbühne Berlin ensemble.

Filmography

Awards and nominations

References

External links 
 

1976 births
20th-century German male actors
21st-century German male actors
Male actors from Hamburg
German male film actors
German male stage actors
German male television actors
Living people